Hader may refer to:

Places
Hađer, Croatia
Hader, Minnesota, United States 
Hader, Quneitra Governorate, Syria

People with the surname

 Berta and Elmer Hader, American couple who illustrated and wrote children's books
 Bill Hader (born 1978), American actor, voice actor, comedian, producer and writer
 Denise Crosswhite Hader (born 1965), American politician
 Josef Hader (born 1962), Austrian comedian, actor, and writer
 Josh Hader (born 1994), American professional baseball pitcher

See also
Haeder, surname